KLUZ-TV (channel 14) is a television station in Albuquerque, New Mexico, United States, broadcasting the Spanish-language Univision network to most of the state. It is owned by TelevisaUnivision, which maintains a local marketing agreement (LMA) with Entravision Communications, owner of UniMás affiliate KTFQ-TV (channel 41), for the provision of certain services. Both stations share studios on Broadbent Parkway in northeastern Albuquerque, while KLUZ-TV's transmitter is located in Rio Rancho.

History

Prior usage of channel 14 in Albuquerque

Channel 14 signed on as KGSW on May 8, 1981. The call sign was derived from the station's original owners, Galaxy Communications and Southwest Television. Initially, KGSW carried drama shows, movies from the 1940s through the 1970s, sitcoms, and religious shows. In the fall of 1983, the station added more sitcoms and began running cartoons in the 7–9 a.m. and the 3–5 p.m. weekday slots.

In 1984, the Providence Journal Company bought KGSW from the original owners. The station affiliated with the Fox network when the network launched on October 9, 1986. The station continued a general entertainment format with cartoons, sitcoms, and movies. KGSW also carried a news capsule titled Fox 14 News Update. In the fall of 1992, after KKTO-TV (channel 2) went dark, Providence Journal acquired its programming and integrated it into KGSW's lineup. Shortly afterward, it acquired the KKTO license as well, and on April 5, 1993, KGSW moved to channel 2 and changed call letters to KASA-TV. The channel 14 license was then surrendered to the Federal Communications Commission (FCC) for cancellation.

In 1997, Paxson Communications was awarded a construction permit for a new station on channel 14; in April 1999, it signed on as Pax TV station KAPX. Paxson chose to sell some of its stations, including KAPX; in 2003, Univision bought the station, and that June relaunched channel 14 as Telefutura (now UniMás) affiliate KTFQ.

KLUZ-TV

KLUZ began operation in September 1987 on channel 41 and has been a Univision affiliate since then. In 2007, it added LATV as a digital subchannel on 41.2.

On December 4, 2017, as part of a channel swap made by Entravision Communications, KLUZ and sister station KTFQ swapped channel numbers, with KLUZ moving from digital channel 42 and virtual channel 41 to digital channel 22 and virtual channel 14.

Newscasts

In 1992, KLUZ premiered a news program called 5 en Punto (five o'clock). In 1993, KLUZ launched Albuquerque's first Spanish-language newscast, Noticias 41. The show was anchored by New Mexico native Bonita Ulibarrí, along with weatherman Sergio Schwartz and sportscaster Liliana Carrillo. The newscast aired Monday through Friday at 10 p.m.

In 1993, the station launched a 5 p.m. program that replaced 5 En Punto and was anchored by Ulibarrí. Schwartz continued to do weather, but a new sportscaster, Donaldo Zepeda, was introduced. For the 10 p.m. broadcast, Ulibarrí was replaced as anchor by Susana Olivares, with Zepeda and Schwartz in the same respective roles.

On January 30, 1994, the station hired Roberto Repreza to anchor both the 5 p.m. and 10 p.m. newscasts. Ulibarrí returned to the 10 p.m. broadcast as a co-anchor. In 1996, Repreza left to go to KXLN-TV, and Ulibarrí returned to being the sole anchor.

On November 2, 2015, Entravision transferred production of KLUZ's newscasts from Albuquerque to Denver sister station KCEC.

Technical information

Subchannels
The station's digital signal is multiplexed:

Analog-to-digital conversion
KLUZ-TV shut down its analog signal, over UHF channel 41, on June 12, 2009, which was the official date in which full-power television stations in the United States transitioned from analog to digital broadcasts under federal mandate. The station's digital signal remained on its pre-transition UHF channel 42. Through the use of PSIP, digital television receivers display the station's virtual channel as its former UHF analog channel 41.

References

External links

Hispanic and Latino American culture in Albuquerque, New Mexico
Television channels and stations established in 1987
Univision network affiliates
1987 establishments in New Mexico
Mass media in Albuquerque, New Mexico
LUZ-TV
Entravision Communications stations
Quest (American TV network) affiliates
Court TV affiliates
Dabl affiliates
Twist (TV network) affiliates